"Pride" is a song by Canadian artist Simon Collins. It was released in August 1999 as the lead single from his debut album, All of Who You Are, and was a top 40 hit in Germany, where it peaked at No. 31, and also reached No. 41 in Canada.

Tracklisting
CD maxi - Germany (1999)
 "Pride" (Album Version) - 5:36
 "Pride" (B-Zet Mix) - 5:09
 "Pride" (Club Sonic Mix) - 6:35
 "Pride" (Radio Edit) - 3:46
 "Light Years Away" (Album Version) - 6:27

Music video
The video was filmed in the Cape Town suburb of Observatory.

Charts

References

1999 singles
1999 songs